James Talmadge Brown (born February 25, 1951) is an American sportscaster known for being the studio host of The James Brown Show and The NFL Today on CBS Sports. He is also a Special Correspondent for CBS News.

He is additionally known for serving as the former host of Fox Sports' NFL pregame show Fox NFL Sunday for eleven years.

Early life
James Brown was born on February 25, 1951, in Washington, D.C. to John and Maryann Brown. He attended DeMatha Catholic High School, and was named to the All-Metropolitan boys basketball teams in 1967 and 1968 with teammates Sid Catlett, Steve Garrett, Aubrey Nash, and Wayne Locket. The team topped the high school national rankings that year under Coach Morgan Wootten; seven players on that squad went to Division I college teams. Brown later graduated from Harvard University with a degree in American Government. A standout on the basketball court, he received All-Ivy League honors in his last three seasons at Harvard and captained the team in his senior year. His roommate was future Harvard professor and activist Cornel West. He was drafted 62 overall by the Atlanta Hawks in 1973.

Broadcasting career

CBS (1970s–1994)
After failing to make a roster spot when he tried out for the NBA's Atlanta Hawks in the mid-1970s, Brown entered the corporate world, working for such companies as Xerox and Eastman Kodak. Brown went into sports broadcasting in 1984 when he was offered a job doing Washington Bullets television broadcasts as well as an analyst job for The NBA on CBS, paired with Frank Glieber. He later moved on to an anchor position at WDVM-TV (later WUSA) in Washington and to some work at CBS Sports. Brown was rehired by CBS Sports in 1987, where he served as play-by-play announcer for the network's NFL and college basketball coverage, as well as reporter for the NBA Finals (calling games with Tom Heinsohn during the 1990 NBA Playoffs) and the 1990 National League Championship Series. He also was host of the afternoon show from the 1992 Winter Olympics in Albertville, France and the 1994 Winter Olympics in Lillehammer, Norway. While at CBS he also was co-host of CBS Sports Saturday/Sunday, a weekend anthology series.

Fox, and back to CBS (1994–present)
In 1994, Brown accepted the position of host of the NFL on Fox pregame show. He shared the set with former football players Terry Bradshaw and Howie Long and former coach Jimmy Johnson.  Cris Collinsworth and Ronnie Lott have also appeared on the program during Brown's time there.

From 1994–1998, Brown was the lead studio host for FOX NHL Saturday. He appeared in a similar capacity in the EA Sports video game NHL '97, which used full-motion video. His voice appeared in Madden NFL 2001. On August 23, 1997, Brown filled-in for Chip Caray as the studio host for Fox Saturday Baseball.

James Brown worked for the joint HBO/Showtime pay-per-view boxing match involving Lennox Lewis and Mike Tyson.

Following the 2005 NFL season, Brown left Fox in order to rejoin CBS Sports, citing a desire to remain closer to his home in Washington, D.C.

Brown was removed from college basketball coverage for CBS after a one-year stint in 2007. However, he still hosts the college basketball pregame, halftime and postgame in the CBS studios in New York City while Greg Gumbel, the main host, is on assignment.

Other appearances

Brown has also hosted The World's Funniest! (the Fox network's counterpart of America's Funniest Home Videos), Coast to Coast (a syndicated radio show formerly hosted by Bob Costas), and served as a correspondent for Real Sports with Bryant Gumbel. Brown appeared on an episode of Married... with Children in a November 24, 1996 episode titled "A Bundy Thanksgiving".

Aside from his Showtime and CBS duties, Brown hosted a weekday radio sports talk show that aired weekdays on Sporting News Radio for several years. Brown left the network in April 2006. He has since, returned to Sporting News Radio with Arnie Spanier.

In March 2009, Brown was named the Community Ambassador for AARP.

On August 10, 2009, Brown interviewed NFL quarterback Michael Vick for a segment that aired on 60 Minutes.

On March 24, 2013, Brown reported on Brian Banks in a segment titled "Blindsided: The Exoneration of Brian Banks" on 60 Minutes.

On May 14, 2013, Brown appeared onstage with the co-CEO of SAP, Bill McDermott, for McDermott's keynote speech at SAPPHIRE NOW from Orlando.

On February 14, July 28-August 1, 2014, December 22–23, 2014, and November 23, 2018, Brown hosted the CBS Evening News covering for Scott Pelley and later Jeff Glor. In 2023, he also substituted for Norah O'Donnell on multiple occassions.Further, Brown has also contributed to CBS This Morning, as well as CBS Sunday Morning, over the years.

Personal life
Brown resides outside of Washington, D.C. in Bethesda, Maryland, his town of birth, with his wife Dorothy and daughter Katrina. He formerly had a second residence in Century City, California, when working on FOX as their NFL program was based in Los Angeles. He was also named one of the 100 most influential student athletes by the NCAA. He has three granddaughters and one grandson, born to his daughter, Katrina and her husband John. Brown is a Christian.

On May 3, 2006, Brown became a minority owner of the Washington Nationals Major League Baseball team. Brown was one of a handful of investors in the group led by Washington, D.C. real estate developer Ted Lerner.

Career timeline
1984–1985: NBA on CBS – Color Commentator 
1984–1986: College Basketball on CBS – Color commentator
1987–1990: NBA on CBS – Sideline reporter
1987–1993: NFL on CBS – Play-by-play
1989–1990: NBA on CBS – Play-by-play
1990–1993, 2007: College Basketball on CBS – Play-by-play
1990: Major League Baseball on CBS – Sideline reporter
1994–2005: Fox NFL Sunday – Host
1994–1998: NHL on Fox – Studio host
2006–present: The NFL Today – Host
2008–present: Inside the NFL – Host
2014–present: CBS Evening News – Substitute anchor
2017–2019: The James Brown Show - host

References

External links

Jaffe, Harry. "James Brown: Making Mama Proud", Washingtonian, December 1, 2008.
Issue 44 -- Television Sportscasters (African-American)
Fox's Brown Will Leave to Be CBS's N.F.L. Host
Brown Leaving Fox's Pregame for CBS
James Brown is switching jerseys.
Official CBS news release.

1951 births
Living people
African-American basketball players
African-American Christians
African-American sports announcers
African-American sports journalists
American sports journalists
American male journalists
American television sports announcers
American sports radio personalities
American television reporters and correspondents
Atlanta Hawks draft picks
Basketball players from Maryland
CBS News people
College basketball announcers in the United States
DeMatha Catholic High School alumni
Harvard Crimson men's basketball players
Major League Baseball broadcasters
National Basketball Association broadcasters
National Football League announcers
National Hockey League broadcasters
NFL Europe broadcasters
Parade High School All-Americans (boys' basketball)
People from Bethesda, Maryland
Pete Rozelle Radio-Television Award recipients
Basketball players from Washington, D.C.
Sports Emmy Award winners
Washington Nationals owners
American men's basketball players
21st-century African-American people
20th-century African-American sportspeople